Onokhoy (Nokhoi) is an urban locality (an urban-type settlement) in Zaigrayevsky District of the Republic of Buryatia, Russia. As of the 2010 Census, its population was 10,689.

Administrative and municipal status
Within the framework of administrative divisions, the urban-type settlement (inhabited locality) of Onokhoy is, together with two rural localities (the selo of Todogto and the settlement of Nizhniye Taltsy), incorporated within Zaigrayevsky District as Onokhoy Urban-Type Settlement (an administrative division of the district). As a municipal division, the territories of Onokhoy and Todogto, together with two rural localities in Dabatuysky Somon (the selo of Stary Onokhoy and the ulus of Onokhoy-Shibir), are incorporated within Zaigrayevsky Municipal District as Onokhoy Urban Settlement. The settlement of Nizhniye Taltsy is municipally incorporated as Taletskoye Rural Settlement in Zaigrayevsky Municipal District.

References

Notes

Sources

Urban-type settlements in Buryatia
Populated places in Zaigrayevsky District
